Maurice Keith Smith (September 1926, Hamilton, New Zealand - December 2020, Harvard, Massachusetts) was a New Zealand-born architect and architectural educator. Smith's work and teaching builds upon the idea of creating "habitable three-dimensional fields" as a working method for his projects. Smith was Emeritus Professor of Architecture at MIT.

Early life
Smith left New Zealand to study at Massachusetts Institute of Technology in the United States on a Fulbright Scholarship in 1952. During this time Smith studied under, and worked for, various MIT faculty and visiting faculty, including Carl Koch, Serge Chermayeff, Richard Buckminster Fuller, and György Kepes.

Career
Back in New Zealand in the mid-1950s, Smith designed a number of buildings, including individual houses in Auckland and the Firth Offices in Hastings, before returning to the US in 1958. There he taught from 1958 to 1996 at the School of Architecture, Massachusetts Institute of Technology. He returned to New Zealand to teach at the Auckland University School of Architecture for one term in 1968.

Smith's notable buildings include: 
the offices of Firth Concrete, Hastings, New Zealand, 1958 (demolished), 
Indian Hill House (Blackman House I) in Groton, Massachusetts (1962–63)
Blackman House II in Manchester, Massachusetts (1992–93).

References 

Ahmad, Amin. (1994)  The Smith House: Built Collage. Thresholds #9, March 1994:Department of Architecture, MIT, Cambridge, Massachusetts. pp. 3, 6.
Clark, Justine. Walker, Paul. (2000)  LOOKING FOR THE LOCAL: ARCHITECTURE AND THE NEW ZEALAND MODERN. Victoria University Press. Wellington New Zealand.  pp. 49, 110.
Donat, John. "House, Groton, Massachusetts" World Architecture (1967) v. 4, pp. [24]-[33]
Gatley, Julia (ed.). (2008). "Long Live The Modern: New Zealand's New Architecture, 1904-84" Auckland, NZ: Auckland University Press.
"'I'conoclast." Content. vol.3 (2015): 42-46.
Jarzombek, Mark. (2013) "The Alternative Firmitas of Marice Smith" in Dutta, Arindam (Ed.) A second modernism : MIT, architecture, and the 'techno-social' moment Cambridge MA: MIT Press
Koeper, H. F. "The Discussions: At the Summit"  Journal of Architectural Education (1947–1974)  Vol. 14, No. 2, ACSA-AIA Seminar: The Teaching of Architecture (Autumn, 1959), pp. 5–9.
"Maurice Smith" in Lost Property - Auckland's Alternative Modernist Architecture and History
McMahon, Peter, and Christine Cipriani. (2014) Cape Cod Modern: Midcentury Architecture and Community on the Outer Cape. New York: Metropolis Books.
Miller, Nory "The MIT connection: design directions from MIT" Progressive Architecture  (March 1982) v.63, n.3, pp. 104–108.
Pedret, Annie. (1994)  A-Form-isms: The Workings of Maurice Smith. Thresholds #9, March 1994: Department of Architecture, MIT, Cambridge, Massachusetts. pp. 3, 6.
Pevsner, Nikolaus (Richards, J.M. ed.) (1959) Commonwealth I. Special Issue: Deals with the Dominions with temperate climes. Canada, South Africa, Australia, New Zealand. The Architectural Review, v. 126, # 752, October 1959. pp. 208.
Plummer, Henry. (2003)  Masters of Light: Twentieth Century Pioneers. Architecture and Urbanism Extra Edition, A+U 2003:11, Tokyo Japan. pp. 34(35).
Plummer, Henry. "Blackman House, Groton, Massachusetts, 1962-63" Architecture and Urbanism (September 1989) n.9, pp.[182]-193,276.
Robbins, Edward, Maurice K. Smith, Gary A. Hack and  Tunney F. Lee "The Client in Architectural Education: Three Interviews at M.I.T." Journal of Architectural Education (Autumn, 1981) v. 35, n. 1, pp. 32–35.
Smith, Maurice K."Dimensional self-stability and displacement in field-ordered directional alternations" Places (1988) v.5, n.2, pp. 72–86. 
Smith, Maurice K. "Fragment: frammenti di teoria, pratica" Rotch Library, MIT, Massachusetts
Smith, Maurice "Frammenti di teoria/pratica = Fragments of theory/practice" Spazio e Societa (June 1982) v.5, n.18, pp. 36–63.
Smith, Maurice K. "Particular associative habitable (built) environments" Progressive Architecture (March 1982), v.63, n.3, pp. 100–103.
Smith, Maurice K. "A House by Maurice Smith" Harvard Art Review (winter 1967), v.2, n.1, pp. 40–45.
Smith, Maurice K. "Not Writing on Built Form", Harvard Educational Review (1969), v.39, n.4, pp. 69–84.
Smith, Maurice K., Hille, R.Thomas, and Andres Mignucci. 1982. Ranges of Continuity: Eleven Towns in Spain and Portugal. Exhibit, Department of Architecture, M.I.T.
Wood, Peter "Doodlebug out of Canon's range" Architecture New Zealand  (November–December 2005) n.6, pp. 104–106.

New Zealand architects
1926 births
20th-century American architects
MIT School of Architecture and Planning alumni
New Zealand emigrants to the United States
Fulbright alumni